John Pratt (October 12, 1753 – December 27, 1824) was an officer in the United States Army who served as acting Adjutant General of the U.S. Army from 1790 to 1791.

See also 
 List of Adjutants General of the United States Army

References

External links 
 Biography from the Dallas Museum of Art

1753 births
1824 deaths
Adjutants general of the United States Army
American people of the Northwest Indian War
Continental Army officers from Pennsylvania
Inspectors General of the United States Army